William Kenneth Hartmann (born June 6, 1939) is a noted planetary scientist, artist, author, and writer. He was the first to convince the scientific mainstream that the Earth had once been hit by a planet sized body (Theia), creating both the Moon and the Earth's 23.5° tilt.<ref name=Cat1>Birth of the Planet, November 24, 2008, Channel 4</ref>

Early life and education
Hartmann was born in Pennsylvania in 1939. He was awarded a Bachelor of Science degree (B.S.) in physics from Pennsylvania State University, and both a Master of Science degree (M.S.) in geology and Doctor of Philosophy (PhD) in astronomy from the University of Arizona.

Career
Hartmann's career spans over 40 years, from work in the early 1960s with Gerard Kuiper on Mare Orientale, and work on the Mariner 9 Mars mapping project, to work on the Mars Global Surveyor imaging team. He is currently a senior scientist at the Planetary Science Institute.

He has long been one of America's leading space artists (strongly influenced by Chesley Bonestell), and has written and illustrated numerous books on the history of Earth and the Solar System, often in collaboration with artist Ron Miller.

Hartmann is a Fellow of the International Association of Astronomical Artists. His written work also includes textbooks, short fiction, and novels, the most recent being published in 2003. In 1997 he was the first recipient of the Carl Sagan Medal for Excellence in Public Communication in Planetary Science from the American Astronomical Society, Division for Planetary Sciences.

Hartmann was a member of the 1966–1968 University of Colorado UFO Project (informally known as the Condon Committee), a controversial public study of UFOs sponsored by the U.S. Air Force. He primarily investigated photographic evidence, and rejected most as unreliable or inconclusive; in his studies published in the Committee's final report, he concluded two cases - Great Falls (motion pictures of two bright light sources difficult to reconcile with known aircraft) and McMinnville (two photographs of a saucer-shaped craft) - were unexplained and particularly noteworthy as probative evidence of the reality of UFOs.

Asteroid 3341 Hartmann is named after him.

Bibliography
 Out of the Cradle: Exploring the Frontiers beyond Earth, with Ron Miller and Pamela Lee (1984)
 The History of Earth: An illustrated chronicle of an evolving planet, with Ron Miller (1991)
 Mars Underground, (1997)
 The Grand Tour: A Traveler's Guide to the Solar System'', with Ron Miller (1st edition 1981, 2nd edition 1993, 3rd edition 2005)

See also
 Giant impact hypothesis
 Viktor Safronov

References

External links
 
 
 William Hartmann's Home Page

1939 births
Living people
People from Westmoreland County, Pennsylvania
Novelists from Pennsylvania
20th-century American novelists
20th-century American astronomers
21st-century American astronomers
American science writers
American science fiction writers
American male novelists
American UFO writers
American artists
Space artists
Eberly College of Science alumni
Planetary scientists
Ufologists
University of Arizona alumni
American male short story writers
20th-century American short story writers
21st-century short story writers
20th-century American male writers
21st-century American male writers
20th-century American non-fiction writers
21st-century American non-fiction writers
American male non-fiction writers
Barringer Medal winners
American historical fiction writers